, there were 2,414 death row inmates in the United States. The number of death row inmates changes frequently with new convictions, appellate decisions overturning conviction or sentence alone, commutations, or deaths (through execution or otherwise). Due to this fluctuation as well as lag and inconsistencies in inmate reporting procedures across jurisdictions, the information in this article may present inaccuracies.

Demographics

Ethnicity of defendants on death row
White: 1,023 (42.38%)
African-American: 986 (40.85%)
Hispanic: 335 (13.88%)
Asian: 46 (1.91%)
Native American: 24 (0.99%)

Gender of defendants on death row

Male: 2,364 (97.93%)
Female: 50 (2.07%)

Comparatively, 50.8% of the U.S. population is female, and 49.2% is male (USCB 2018).

Education
 69.75% have less than a high school diploma or GED.

Comparatively, 12.19% of U.S. adults have less than a high school diploma or GED.

Mental illness
 It has been estimated that over 10% of death row inmates have a mental illness.

Comparatively, it is estimated that 4.2% of American adults have a serious mental illness.

Time on death row
Median time, in years, a death row prisoner has been awaiting execution: 7
Average time, in years, between imposition of a death sentence and execution: 12
For 2020: 22 years on average between offense and execution.

Later found innocent or exonerated
 1.6% of death row prisoners since 1972 have been formally exonerated and released.

List of death row inmates by jurisdiction

Federal

 On death row: 44
 Total number executed: 50 (1927–2021)

Due to the high number of federal death row inmates, only prisoners with Wikipedia pages are listed in this article. A full list is externally linked:
List of federal death row inmates

Military

On death row: 4
Total number executed: 135 (1916 to present)

Alabama

On death row: 166
Total number executed: 70 (1976–present)

Due to the high number of Alabama death row inmates, only prisoners with Wikipedia pages are listed in this article. A full list is externally linked:
List of death row inmates in Alabama

American Samoa

On death row: 0 
Total number executed: 0 (1949–present)

Capital punishment exists as a punishment in American Samoa, an unincorporated territory of the United States, but does not have a prescribed method of execution. No executions have been imposed or performed since the territory gained self-governance in 1949; the last executions occurred in the late 1930s, when the island was under the control of the United States Navy.

Arizona

On death row: 109
Total number executed: 143 (1800–2022)

Due to the high number of Arizona death row inmates, only prisoners with Wikipedia pages are listed in this article. A full list is externally linked:
List of death row inmates in Arizona

Arkansas

On death row: 30
Total number executed: 200 (1913–2017)

Due to the high number of Arkansas death row inmates, only prisoners with Wikipedia pages are listed in this article. A full list is externally linked:
List of death row inmates in Arkansas

California

On death row: 689
Total number executed: 722 (1700–2006)

Due to the high number of California death row inmates, only prisoners with Wikipedia pages are listed in this article. A full list is externally linked:
List of death row inmates in California

Florida

On death row: 300
Total number executed: 412 (1800–2020) 

Due to the high number of Florida death row inmates, only prisoners with Wikipedia pages are listed in this article. A full list is externally linked:
List of death row inmates in Florida

Georgia

On death row: 38
Total number executed: 1021 (1700–2020)

Due to the high number of Georgia death row inmates, only prisoners with Wikipedia pages are listed in this article. A full list is externally linked:
List of death row inmates in Georgia

Idaho

On death row: 8
Total number executed: 29 (since 1864)

Indiana

On death row: 8 (November 21, 2020)
Total number executed: 151 (1800–2009)

Kansas

On death row: 9
Total number executed: 57 (1800–1965)
List of death row inmates in Kansas

Kentucky

On death row: 26
Total number executed:  427

Due to the high number of Kentucky death row inmates, only prisoners with Wikipedia pages are listed in this article. A full list is externally linked:
List of death row inmates in Kentucky

Louisiana

On death row: 64
Total number executed: 659 (1700–2010)

Due to the high number of Louisiana death row inmates, only prisoners with Wikipedia pages are listed in this article. A full list is externally linked:
List of death row inmates in Louisiana

Mississippi

On death row: 35
Total number executed: 374 (1800–2022)

Due to the high number of Mississippi death row inmates, only prisoners with Wikipedia pages are listed in this article. A full list is externally linked:
List of death row inmates in Mississippi

Missouri

On death row: 15
Total number executed: 375 (1800–2023)
List of death row inmates in Missouri

Montana

On death row: 2
Total number executed: 74 (1800–2006)

Nebraska

On death row: 11
Total number executed: 41 (1862–2018)

Nevada

On death row: 64
Total number executed: 71 (1863–2006)

New Hampshire

On death row: 1 (2014)
Total number executed: 24 (1700–1939)

Note: On May 30, 2019, the state Senate voted to override Governor Chris Sununu's veto on a bill that abolished the state's death penalty 16–8. Since the veto had previously been overridden by the state House of Representatives, the bill immediately became law and repealed capital punishment, replacing it with life in prison without the possibility of parole. The law was not applied retroactively and the one person on death row at the time of abolition remains there.

North Carolina

On death row: 137
Total number executed: 822 (1608–2006)

Due to the high number of North Carolina death row inmates, only prisoners with Wikipedia pages are listed in this article. A full list is externally linked:
List of death row inmates in North Carolina

Ohio

On death row: 130
Total number executed: 483 (1700–2018)

Due to the high number of Ohio death row inmates, only prisoners with Wikipedia pages are listed in this article. A full list is externally linked:
List of death row inmates in Ohio

Oklahoma

On death row: 39
Total number executed: 238 (1800–2023)

Due to the high number of Oklahoma death row inmates, only prisoners with Wikipedia pages are listed in this article. A full list is externally linked:
List of death row inmates in Oklahoma

Oregon

On death row: 0 (December 13, 2022)
Total number executed: 124 (1800–1997)

Pennsylvania

On death row: 105 (July 1, 2022)
Total number executed: 1,043 (1608–1999)

Owing to the high number of Pennsylvania death row inmates, only prisoners with Wikipedia pages are listed in this article. A full list is externally linked:
List of death row inmates in Pennsylvania

South Carolina

On death row: 35
Total number executed: 683 (1700–2011)

Due to the high number of South Carolina death row inmates, only prisoners with Wikipedia pages are listed in this article. A full list is externally linked:
List of death row inmates in South Carolina

South Dakota

On death row: 1
Total number executed: 20 (1877-2019)

Tennessee

On death row: 46
Total number executed: 134

Due to the high number of Tennessee death row inmates, only prisoners with Wikipedia pages are listed in this article. A full list is externally linked:
List of death row inmates in Tennessee

Texas

On death row: 184
Total number executed: 1,338 (1800–2023)

Due to the high number of Texas death row inmates, only prisoners with Wikipedia pages or part of a criminal enterprise with a separate Wikipedia page are listed in this article. The full list is externally linked:

Faces of Death Row: The Texas Tribune
List of death row inmates in Texas

Utah

On death row: 7
Total number executed: 50 (1800–2010)

Wyoming

On death row: 0
Total number executed: 23 (1866–1992)

Jurisdictions without the death penalty 

Twenty-three states have abolished capital punishment. Crimes committed in these states are still eligible for the death penalty if they are convicted in federal court for certain federal crimes. Capital punishment has been abolished in New Hampshire, but only for new sentences. One prisoner (Michael Addison) who was already sentenced to death remains on death row in the state.

States and the date of abolition of capital punishment:

 Michigan (1846; abolished for murder, retained for treason until 1963)
 Wisconsin (1853)
 Maine (1887)
 Minnesota (1911)
 Hawaii (1948; prior to statehood)
 Alaska (1957; prior to statehood)
 Vermont (1964; abolished for murder, retained for treason until 1972)
 Iowa (1965)
 West Virginia (1965)
 North Dakota (1973)
 Massachusetts (1984)
 Rhode Island (1984)
 New Jersey (2007)
 New York (2007)
 New Mexico (2009)
 Illinois (2011)
 Connecticut (2012)
 Maryland (2013)
 Delaware (2016)
 Washington (2018)
 New Hampshire (2019)
 Colorado (2020)
 Virginia (2021)

Territories and federal districts:

 Puerto Rico (1929)
 Northern Mariana Islands (before 1970; prior to Commonwealth status) 
 Guam (1978) 
 Washington, D.C. (1981)
 United States Virgin Islands (1991)

See also 
 Death row
 Capital punishment in the United States
 List of women on death row in the United States
 List of people executed in the United States in 
 List of people scheduled to be executed in the United States
 List of most recent executions by jurisdiction

References

External links 
 List of death row inmates by state and country
 FindLaw documentation of Nathan Dunlap's appeal to the Supreme Court of Colorado

Capital punishment in the United States
American prisoners sentenced to death
Lists of prisoners and detainees